The Italian Anarchist Federation is an Italian anarchist federation of autonomous anarchist groups all over Italy. The Italian Anarchist Federation was founded in 1945 in Carrara. It adopted an "Associative Pact" and the "Anarchist Program" of Errico Malatesta. It decided to publish the weekly Umanità Nova, retaking the name of the journal published by Errico Malatesta.

Inside the FAI a tendency grouped as (GAAP - Anarchist Groups of Proletarian Action) led by Pier Carlo Masini was founded which "proposed a Libertarian Party with an anarchist theory and practice adapted to the new economic, political and social reality of post-war Italy, with an internationalist outlook and effective presence in the workplaces...The GAAP allied themselves with a similar development within the French Anarchist movement, the Federation Communiste Libertaire, whose leading light was Georges Fontenis."

In the IX Congress of the Italian Anarchist Federation in Carrara, 1965 a group decided to split off from this organization and creates the Gruppi di Iniziativa Anarchica which was mostly composed of individualist anarchists who disagreed with important aspects of the "Associative Pact" and was critical of anarcho-syndicalism. The GIA published the bi-weekly L'Internazionale. Another group split off from the Anarchist Federation and regrouped as Gruppi Anarchici Federati. The GAF later starts publishing Interrogations and A Rivista Anarchica. 
In 1968 in Carrara the International of Anarchist Federations was founded during an international Anarchist conference by the three existing European federations of France, the Italian FAI and the Iberian Anarchist Federation as well as the Bulgarian federation in French exile. 

In the early seventies a platformist tendency emerged within the Italian Anarchist Federation which argued for more strategic coherence and social insertion in the workers movement while rejecting the synthesist "Associative Pact" of Malatesta which the FAI adhered to. These groups started organizing themselves outside the FAI in organizations such as O.R.A. from Liguria which organized a Congress attended by 250 delegates of groups from 60 locations. In 1986, the Congress of ORA/UCAT adopted the name Federation of Anarchist Communists.

In December 2010, several news sources erroneously reported that the FAI had claimed responsibility for a series of mail bombs delivered to foreign embassies in Rome. Other media outlets attributed the bombs to another group, the insurrectionist Informal Anarchist Federation.

See also 
Anarchism in Italy
Anarchist Federation (France)
Iberian Anarchist Federation
Argentinian Libertarian Federation

References

External links
Official website of the Italian FAI
website of ''Umanità Nova

Anarchist organisations in Italy
Anarchist Federations
Far-left politics in Italy
International of Anarchist Federations